Hasanabad-e Tangeh Mu (also Romanized as Ḩasanābād-e Tangeh Mū; also known as Ḩasanābād) is a village in Jahangiri Rural District, in the Central District of Masjed Soleyman County, Khuzestan Province, Iran. At the 2006 census, its population was 71, in 14 families.

References 

Populated places in Masjed Soleyman County